This local electoral calendar for 2016 lists the subnational elections held in 2016. Referendums, retention elections, and national by-elections (special elections) are also included.

January
1 January: Himachal Pradesh, District Councils, Township Councils and Village Councils (1st phase)
2 January: Nigeria, Zamfara, Local Government Councils and Chairmen
3 January: Himachal Pradesh, District Councils, Township Councils and Village Councils (2nd phase)
5 January: Himachal Pradesh, District Councils, Township Councils and Village Councils (3rd phase)
9 January: Nigeria, Bayelsa, Governor (revote) in Southern Ijaw)
10 January: India
Haryana, District Councils, Township Councils and Village Councils (1st phase)
Himachal Pradesh, Municipal Councils
11 January: India, Manipur, Municipal Councils and Town Councils
16 January: Nigeria, Niger, Local Government Councils and Chairmen
17 January: 
India, Haryana, District Councils, Township Councils and Village Councils (2nd phase)
Mexico, Colima, 
18 January: Pakistan, NA-218, National Assembly by-election
24 January: India, Haryana, District Councils, Township Councils and Village Councils (3rd phase)
25 January: Bhutan, District Heads, District Agents, District Councillors, Block Heads, Block Deputies and Block Councils (1st round 1st phase)

February
2 February: India, Telangana, Hyderabad Metropolitan Region, Greater Hyderabad Municipal Corporation
4 February: Bermuda, Devonshire North Central, House of Assembly by-election
7 February: Costa Rica, Mayors, Municipal Councils, District Councils and District Council Presidents
San José, Mayor, Deputy Mayors, Aldermen, Trustees and District Council
8 February: Rwanda, Cell Councils and Village Executive Committees
9 February: Rwanda, School and Business Community Representatives
12–13 February: Rwanda, Youth Councils
13 February: India, Karnataka, District Councils and Township Councils (1st phase)
16 February: United States, Milwaukee, Mayor and Common Council (1st round)
20 February: 
India, Karnataka, District Councils and Township Councils (2nd phase)
Kuwait, Third District, National Assembly by-election
21 February: Comoros
Autonomous Island of Anjouan, Governor (1st round)
Autonomous Island of Grande Comore, Governor (1st round)
Autonomous Island of Mohéli, Governor (1st round)
22 February: Rwanda, District Councils
28 February: 
Austria, Tyrol, 
Hong Kong, New Territories East, Legislative Council by-election
Switzerland
Aargau, 
Basel-Stadt, referendums
Bern, 
Geneva, referendums
Jura, referendum
Lucerne, 
Neuchâtel, referendum
Schaffhausen, referendums
Schwyz, 
Solothurn, 
St. Gallen, Government (1st round) and Cantonal Council
Thurgau, Executive Council
Ticino, referendum
Uri, Executive Council, Landrat and 
Zürich,

March
1 March: United States, Arkansas, Supreme Court and Court of Appeals (1st round)
5 March: Zimbabwe, Mhondoro-Mubaira, House of Assembly by-election
6 March: 
Germany, Hesse, 
Frankfurt, 
Poland, senatorial constituency No. 59, Senate by-election
7 March: Kenya
Malindi, National Assembly by-election
Kericho, Senate by-election
9 March: Saint Helena, Ascension and Tristan da Cunha, Tristan da Cunha, Chief Islander and Island Council
12 March: Nigeria, Sokoto, Local Government Councils and Chairmen
13 March: 
France, Aisne, Nord and Yvelines, 
Germany
Baden-Württemberg, Parliament
Rhineland-Palatinate, Parliament
Saxony-Anhalt, Parliament
17 March: Pakistan, NA-153, National Assembly by-election
18 March: Guyana, Municipal Councils and Neighborhood Democratic Councils
19 March: Australia, Queensland, Referendum, Mayors, Regional Councils, City Councils, Aboriginal Shire Councils and Shire Councils
Brisbane, Lord Mayor and City Council
20 March: 
France, Aisne, Nord and Yvelines, 
Kazakhstan, Regional Councils and City Councils
Laos, Provincial People's Councils
Switzerland
Schwyz, Executive Council and Cantonal Council
Vaud, referendum
Tanzania, Zanzibar, President, House of Representatives, District Councils, Town Councils and Municipal Council
22 March: 
Bangladesh, Union Councils (1st phase)
Pakistan, NA-101, National Assembly by-election
23 March: Saint Helena, Ascension and Tristan da Cunha, Saint Helena, Legislative Council by-election
27 March: 
Japan, Kumamoto, Governor
Kyrgyzstan, City Councils and Village Councils
Ukraine, Kryvyi Rih, 
31 March: Bangladesh, Union Councils (2nd phase)

April
3 April: 
Abkhazia, District Assemblies and Sukhumi City Council
Ecuador, Las Golondrinas, Join Which Province referendum
4 April: 
Canada, Saskatchewan, Legislative Assembly
India
Assam, Legislative Assembly (1st phase)
West Bengal, Legislative Assembly (1st phase-a)
5 April: United States
Anchorage, Assembly
Wisconsin, Supreme Court and Court of Appeals
Milwaukee, Mayor and Common Council (2nd round)
7 April: Pakistan, NA-245, National Assembly by-election
9 April: Nigeria, Federal Capital Territory, Local Government Councils and Chairmen
10 April: 
Comoros
Autonomous Island of Anjouan, Governor (2nd round)
Autonomous Island of Grande Comore, Governor (2nd round)
Autonomous Island of Mohéli, Governor (2nd round)
Switzerland, Thurgau, Grand Council
11 April: India
Assam, Legislative Assembly (2nd phase)
West Bengal, Legislative Assembly (1st phase-b)
11–13 April: Sudan, Darfur, Administrative Status referendum
12 April: United States, Long Beach, City Council (1st round)
13 April: Nigeria, Federal Capital Territory, Local Government Councils and Chairmen (revotes)
16 April: Nigeria, Ondo, Local Government Councils and Chairmen
17 April: 
France, Loire-Atlantique, 
India, West Bengal, Legislative Assembly (2nd phase)
19 April: Canada, Manitoba, Legislative Assembly
21 April: India, West Bengal, Legislative Assembly (3rd phase)
23 April: Bangladesh, Union Councils (3rd phase)
24 April: 
France, Loire-Atlantique, 
India, Bihar, District Councils, Township Councils and Village Councils (1st phase)
Japan, Hokkaido 5th district and Kyoto 3rd district, House of Representatives 
Serbia, Municipal Assemblies
Vojvodina, Assembly
Switzerland
Appenzell Innerrhoden, Landsgemeinde
St. Gallen, Government (2nd round)
25 April: India, West Bengal, Legislative Assembly (4th phase)
28 April: 
India, Bihar, District Councils, Township Councils and Village Councils (2nd phase)
Isle of Man, Local Authority Commissioners and Local Authority Councils
Pakistan, NA-267, National Assembly by-election
30 April: India, West Bengal, Legislative Assembly (5th phase)

May
1 May: Switzerland, Glarus, 
2 May: India, Bihar, District Councils, Township Councils and Village Councils (3rd phase)
5 May: 
India, West Bengal, Legislative Assembly (6th phase)
United Kingdom, Local elections
Ogmore and Sheffield Brightside and Hillsborough, House of Commons 
England, Metropolitan Borough Councils, Unitary Authorities, District Councils, Mayors and Police Commissioners
Birmingham, City Council
Bristol, Mayor and City Council
Greater London, Mayor and Assembly
Leeds, City Council
Liverpool, Mayor and City Council
Manchester, City Council
Northern Ireland, Assembly
Scotland, Parliament
Wales, National Assembly
Police Commissioners
6 May: India, Bihar, District Councils, Township Councils and Village Councils (4th phase)
7 May: 
Australia, Tasmania, (Apsley and Elwick) Legislative Council
Bangladesh, Union Councils (4th phase)
Malaysia, Sarawak, Legislative Assembly
Singapore, Bukit Batok, Parliament by-election
United States, Arlington, City Council
8 May: 
Italy, Trentino-Alto Adige/Südtirol, Mayors and Municipal Councils (1st round)
Lebanon, Mount Lebanon, Municipal Councils
Beirut City, Municipal Council
9 May: 
Canada, New Brunswick, Mayors and Municipal Councils
Philippines, Governors, Provincial Councils, Mayors and Municipal Councils
Autonomous Region in Muslim Mindanao, Governor and Regional Assembly
10 May: 
India, Bihar, District Councils, Township Councils and Village Councils (5th phase)
United States, West Virginia, Supreme Court of Appeals
11 May: Comoros, Autonomous Island of Anjouan, President 
14 May: India, Bihar, District Councils, Township Councils and Village Councils (6th phase)
15 May: 
Dominican Republic, Mayors and District Councils
Italy, Aosta Valley, Mayors and Municipal Councils
Lebanon, Beirut and Beqaa, Municipal Councils
16 May: India
Tura, House of the People by-election
Kerala, Legislative Assembly
Puducherry, Legislative Assembly
Tamil Nadu, Legislative Assembly
17 May: United States
Idaho, Supreme Court and Court of Appeals (1st round)
Portland, Mayor and City Commission (1st round)
18 May: India, Bihar, District Councils, Township Councils and Village Councils (7th phase)
22 May: 
Burkina Faso, Municipal Councils
France, Bas-Rhin and Alpes Maritimes, 
India
Bihar, District Councils, Township Councils and Village Councils (8th phase)
Haryana, Municipal Councils
Italy, Trentino-Alto Adige/Südtirol, Mayors and Municipal Councils (2nd round)
Lebanon
Jezzine, Parliament by-election
Nabatieh and South, Municipal Councils
Vietnam, 
24 May: United States, Georgia, Supreme Court and Court of Appeals
26 May: India, Bihar, District Councils, Township Councils and Village Councils (9th phase)
28 May: Bangladesh, Union Councils (5th phase)
29 May: 
France, Bas-Rhin and Alpes Maritimes, 
Lebanon, Akkar and North, Municipal Councils
30 May: India, Bihar, District Councils, Township Councils and Village Councils (10th phase)

June
3 June: Australia, Norfolk Island, Regional Council
4 June: Bangladesh, Union Councils (6th phase)
5 June: 
France, Ain, 
Italy, Mayors and Municipal Councils (1st round)
Bologna, Mayor and City Council (1st round)
Milan, Mayor, City Council, Borough Presidents and Borough Councils (1st round)
Naples, Mayor and City Council (1st round)
Rome, Mayor and City Council (1st round)
Turin, Mayor and City Council (1st round)
Japan, Okinawa, Prefectural Assembly
Mexico, State elections
Aguascalientes, 
Baja California, 
Chihuahua, 
Durango, 
Hidalgo, 
Mexico City, Constituent Assembly
Oaxaca, 
Puebla, 
Quintana Roo, 
Sinaloa, 
Tamaulipas, 
Tlaxcala, 
Veracruz, 
Zacatecas, 
Romania, County Presidents, County Councils, Mayors, Local Councils, Sector Mayors and Sector Councils
Switzerland
Aargau, 
Basel-Landschaft, 
Basel-Stadt, referendums
Geneva, referendums
Jura, referendum
Nidwalden, referendum
Schwyz, 
St. Gallen, 
Thurgau, 
Ticino, referendums
Uri, 
Zürich, 
7 June: United States
Ohio's 8th congressional district, U.S. House of Representatives special election
Bakersfield, Mayor (1st round)
Fresno, Mayor and City Council (1st round)
Long Beach, City Council (2nd round)
Los Angeles County, Board of Supervisors (1st round)
Orange County, CA, Board of Supervisors (1st round)
Riverside County, Board of Supervisors (1st round)
Sacramento, Mayor and City Council
San Bernardino County, Board of Supervisors (1st round)
San Diego County, Board of Supervisors (1st round)
San Diego, Mayor, City Attorney, Boards of Education, City Council (1st round) and Referendums
Santa Clara County, Board of Supervisors
San Jose, City Council (1st round)
12 June: France, Ain, 
16 June: United Kingdom, Tooting, House of Commons by-election
18 June: Malaysia, Kuala Kangsar and Sungai Besar, House of Representatives by-elections
19 June: Italy, Mayors and Municipal Councils (2nd round)
Bologna, Mayor and City Council (2nd round)
Milan, Mayor, City Council, Borough Presidents and Borough Councils (2nd round)
Naples, Mayor and City Council (2nd round)
Rome, Mayor and City Council (2nd round)
Turin, Mayor and City Council (2nd round)
26 June: France, Loire-Atlantique, 
28 June: United States, Tulsa, Mayor and City Council (1st round)
29 June: 
Mongolia, Ulaanbaatar, City Council
Tonga, 
Vanuatu, Malo/Aore, Parliament by-election

July
3 July: Switzerland, Schaffhausen, referendums
10 July: Japan, Kagoshima, Governor
14 July: Tonga, Vavaʻu 16, Parliament by-election
17 July: Ukraine, Volyn constituency 23, Dnipropetrovsk constituency 27, Ivano-Frankivsk constituency 85, Luhansk constituency 114, Poltava constituency 151, Kherson constituency 183 and Chernihiv constituency 206, Parliament by-elections
18 July: Bangladesh, Mymensingh-1 and Mymensingh-3, House of the Nation by-elections
21 July: Pakistan, Azad Kashmir, Legislative Assembly
30 July: Nigeria, Adamawa, Local Government Councils and Chairmen
31 July: Japan, Tokyo, Governor

August
3 August: South Africa, District Councils, Metropolitan Councils and Local Councils
4 August: United States, Tennessee, Supreme Court, Court of Appeals and Court of Criminal Appeals retention elections
6 August: Nigeria, Adamawa, Local Government Councils and Chairmen (revotes)
11 August: Zambia, Mayors, District Councils, Council Chairs and Municipal Councils
13 August: United States, Honolulu, Mayor and City Council (1st round)
21 August: Turkmenistan, Regional Councils and District Councils
27 August: Australia, Northern Territory, Legislative Assembly
28 August: Switzerland, Schaffhausen, Executive Council
30 August: United States
Mesa, Mayor and City Council (1st round)
Miami-Dade County, Mayor (1st round) and County Commission
31 August: Pakistan, NA-63, National Assembly by-election

September
1 September: Saint Helena, Ascension and Tristan da Cunha, Ascension Island, Council
4 September: 
Cape Verde, Municipal Chambers and Municipal Assemblies
Germany, Mecklenburg-Vorpommern, Parliament
7 September: 
Jersey, Saint Helier No. 1, Parliament by-election
Saint Helena, Ascension and Tristan da Cunha, Saint Helena, Legislative Council 
10 September: Australia, New South Wales, Local Councils
11 September: Germany, Lower Saxony, 
Hanover Region, 
Hanover, 
18 September: 
Germany, Berlin, House of Representatives
Russia, 
Adygea, 
Altai Krai, 
Amur Oblast, 
Astrakhan Oblast, 
Chechnya,  and 
Chukotka Autonomous Okrug, 
Chuvashia, 
Dagestan, 
Ingushetia, 
Jewish Autonomous Oblast, 
Kaliningrad Oblast, 
Kamchatka Krai, 
Karelia (Republic), 
Khanty-Mansi Autonomous Okrug, 
Kirov Oblast, 
Komi Republic, 
Krasnoyarsk Krai, 
Kursk Oblast, 
Leningrad Oblast, 
Lipetsk Oblast, 
Mordovia, 
Moscow Oblast, 
Murmansk Oblast, 
Nizhny Novgorod Oblast, 
Novgorod Oblast, 
Omsk Oblast, 
Orenburg Oblast, 
Oryol Oblast, 
Perm Krai, 
Primorsky Krai, 
Pskov Oblast, 
Saint Petersburg, 
Samara Oblast, 
Stavropol Krai, 
Sverdlovsk Oblast, 
Tambov Oblast, 
Tomsk Oblast, 
Tula Oblast, Governor
Tuva, 
Tver Oblast,  and 
Tyumen Oblast, 
Ulyanovsk Oblast, 
Vologda Oblast, 
Zabaykalsky Krai, 
19 September: Pakistan, NA-162, National Assembly by-election
25 September: 
Bosnia and Herzegovina, Republika Srpska, National Day referendum
Germany, Lower Saxony, 
Spain
Basque Country, Parliament
Galicia, Parliament
Switzerland
Geneva, referendums
Lucerne, 
Neuchâtel, referendums
Nidwalden, referendum
Obwalden, referendum
Schaffhausen, Cantonal Council
Schwyz, 
St. Gallen, 
Ticino, referendums
Uri, 
Valais, referendums
Zug, 
Zürich, 
27 September: Bhutan, District Heads, District Agents, District Councillors, Block Heads, Block Deputies and Block Councils (1st round 2nd phase)
28 September: Nigeria, Edo, Governor

October
1 October: Brazil, Paraná, Rio Grande do Sul and Santa Catarina, South Region Separatist referendum
2 October: 
Bosnia and Herzegovina
Brčko District, Assembly
Federation of Bosnia and Herzegovina, Mayors and Municipal Councils
Republika Srpska, Mayors and Municipal Assemblies
Brazil, Mayors and Municipal Councils (1st round)
São Paulo, Mayor
7–8 October: Czech Republic, Regional Assemblies
8 October: 
Georgia, Adjara, Supreme Council
New Zealand, Regional Councils, Mayors, Territorial Authority Councils and District Health Boards
Auckland, Mayor, Council and Local Boards
Wellington, Mayor and Council
Nigeria, Ogun, Local Government Councils and Chairmen
13 October: Cook Islands, Arutanga-Reureu-Nikaupara, Parliament by-election
15 October: 
Australia, Australian Capital Territory, Legislative Assembly
Canada, Nova Scotia, Mayors and Municipal Councils
Halifax, Mayor, Regional Council and School Boards
16 October: 
Japan, Niigata, 
Portugal, Azores, Legislative Assembly
19 October: 
Guernsey, Vale, Parliament by-election
Mongolia, Provincial Assemblies, District Assemblies and Subdistrict Assemblies
20 October: United Kingdom, Batley and Spen and Witney, House of Commons by-elections
21 October: Bhutan, District Heads, District Agents, District Councillors, Block Heads, Block Deputies and Block Councils (2nd round)
22 October: 
Australia, Victoria, Mayors, City Councils, Shire Councils and Borough Council
City of Melbourne, Lord Mayor and City Council
Zimbabwe, Norton, House of Assembly by-election
23 October: 
Chile, 
Japan
Fukuoka 6th district and Tokyo 10th district, House of Representatives 
Okayama, Governor
Toyama, Governor
Switzerland
Aargau, Executive Council and Grand Council
Basel-Stadt, Executive Council (1st round) and Grand Council
24 October: Canada, Medicine Hat—Cardston—Warner, House of Commons by-election
26 October: Canada, Saskatchewan, Mayors and Municipal Councils
27 October – 7 November: Canada, Prince Edward Island, Electoral Reform referendum
29 October: East Timor, Village Chiefs and Community Chiefs (1st round)
30 October: Brazil, Mayors and Municipal Councils (2nd round)

November
4 November: Bhutan, Thimphu, North Thimphu, National Assembly by-election
6 November: Switzerland, Fribourg, Council of State (1st round) and Grand Council
7 November: Canada, Yukon, Legislative Assembly
8 November: 
Guam, Mayors and Vice-Mayors
Northern Mariana Islands, Municipal Councils and Boards of Education
Puerto Rico, Mayors and Municipal Legislatures
United States of America, Quadrennial elections
Hawaii's 1st congressional district, U.S. House of Representatives special election
Kentucky's 1st congressional district, U.S. House of Representatives special election
Pennsylvania's 2nd congressional district, U.S. House of Representatives 
Washington, D.C., Council
Alabama
Board of Education and Public Service Commission
Supreme Court
Remove Age Restrictions for Government Officials, Right to Work, and Two-Thirds Supermajority for Impeachment constitutional referendums
Alaska
House of Representatives and Senate
Supreme Court and Court of Appeals retention elections
Automatic Voter Registration via Permanent Fund Dividend referendum
Arizona
Corporation Commission
House of Representatives and Senate
Supreme Court and Court of Appeals retention elections
Public Pension Reform constitutional referendum, and Marijuana Legalization and Minimum Wage/Sick Time referendums
Maricopa County, Board of Supervisors and Sheriff
Mesa, City Council (2nd round)
Arkansas
House of Representatives and Senate
Court of Appeals (2nd round)
Medical Marijuana referendum
California
Assembly and Senate
Corporate Political Spending, Criminal Sentences/Juvenile Prosecution, Firearms/Ammunition Regulations, Marijuana Legalization, Multilingual Education, Plastic Bag Ban, Repeal of Death Penalty and State Prescription Drug Purchase referendums
Bakersfield, Mayor (2nd round) and City Council
Fresno, Mayor and City Council (2nd round)
Los Angeles County, Board of Supervisors (2nd round)
Oakland, City Council
Orange County, Board of Supervisors (2nd round)
Riverside County, Board of Supervisors (2nd round)
San Bernardino County, Board of Supervisors (2nd round)
San Diego County, Board of Supervisors (2nd round)
San Diego, City Attorney, City Council (2nd round) and Referendums
San Francisco, Board of Supervisors
San Jose, City Council (2nd round)
Colorado
Board of Education
House of Representatives and Senate
Supreme Court and Court of Appeals retention elections
ColoradoCare, Minimum Wage and Requirements for Citizen-Initiated Amendments constitutional referendums, and Open Presidential Primaries, Physician-Assisted Suicide and Unaffiliated Electors in Primaries referendums
Connecticut
House of Representatives and Senate
Delaware
Governor, Lieutenant Governor and Insurance Commissioner
House of Representatives and Senate
Florida
House of Representatives and Senate
Supreme Court and District Courts of Appeal retention elections
Medical Marijuana and Solar Energy Choice constitutional referendums
Broward County, Commission
Miami-Dade County, Mayor (2nd round)
Georgia
Public Service Commission
House of Representatives and Senate
New Judicial Commission and State Intervention in Failing Schools 
Hawaii
Office of Hawaiian Affairs Board of Trustees
House of Representatives and Senate
Honolulu, Mayor and City Council (2nd round)
Idaho
House of Representatives and Senate
Supreme Court (2nd round)
Legislative Oversight of Administrative Rules constitutional referendum
Illinois
Comptroller special election
House of Representatives and Senate
Appellate Court retention elections, and Appellate Court
Cook County, Board of Review, Clerk of the Circuit Court, Recorder of Deeds, State's Attorney, Water Reclamation District Board, and Earned Sick Time and Eliminate the Recorder of Deeds referendums
Indiana
Governor, Attorney General and Superintendent of Public Instruction
House of Representatives and Senate
Court of Appeals retention elections
Iowa
House of Representatives and Senate
Supreme Court and Court of Appeals retention elections
Kansas
Board of Education
House of Representatives and Senate
Supreme Court and Court of Appeals retention elections
Kentucky
House of Representatives and Senate
Supreme Court
Louisville, Metropolitan Council
Louisiana
Public Service Commission
Supreme Court and Circuit Courts of Appeal
Authority of College Boards to Establish Tuition constitutional referendum
Maine
House of Representatives and Senate
Gun Background Checks, Marijuana Legalization, Minimum Wage and Ranked-Choice Voting referendums
Maryland
Court of Appeals and Court of Special Appeals retention elections
Political Party Affiliation Requirement to Fill Vacancies constitutional referendum 
Baltimore, Mayor and City Council
Massachusetts
Governor's Council
House of Representatives and Senate
Charter School Expansion, Conditions for Farm Animals and Marijuana Legalization referendums
Michigan
Board of Education
House of Representatives
Supreme Court and Court of Appeals
Wayne County, Commission
Minnesota
House of Representatives and Senate
Supreme Court and Court of Appeals
Missouri
Governor, Lieutenant Governor, Attorney General, Secretary of State and Treasurer
House of Representatives and Senate
Supreme Court and Court of Appeals retention elections
Judicial Campaign Contribution Limits, Prohibition on Extending Sales Tax and Voter ID constitutional referendums
Montana
Governor, Attorney General, Auditor, Public Service Commission, Secretary of State and Superintendent of Public Instruction
House of Representatives and Senate
Supreme Court
Medical Marijuana referendum
Nebraska
Board of Education and Public Service Commission
Legislature
Supreme Court and Court of Appeals retention elections
Death Penalty referendum
Nevada
Assembly and Senate
Supreme Court and Court of Appeals
Gun Background Checks and Marijuana Legalization referendums
Clark County, County Commission
New Hampshire
Governor and Executive Council
House of Representatives and Senate
New Mexico
Public Education Commission and Public Regulation Commission, and Secretary of State special election
House of Representatives and Senate
Supreme Court and Court of Appeals retention elections, and Supreme Court and Court of Appeals
New York
Assembly and Senate
North Carolina
Governor, Lieutenant Governor, Agriculture Commissioner, Attorney General, Auditor, Insurance Commissioner, Labor Commissioner, Secretary of State, Superintendent of Public Instruction and Treasurer
House of Representatives and Senate
Supreme Court and Court of Appeals
North Dakota
Governor, Auditor, Insurance Commissioner, Public Service Commission, Superintendent of Public Instruction and Treasurer
House of Representatives and Senate
Supreme Court
Medical Marijuana referendum
Ohio
Board of Education
House of Representatives and Senate
Supreme Court and Courts of Appeal
Oklahoma
Corporation Commission
House of Representatives and Senate
Supreme Court, Court of Civil Appeals and Court of Criminal Appeals 
Public Money for Religious Purposes constitutional referendum
Tulsa, City Council (2nd round)
Oregon
Governor special election, Attorney General, Secretary of State and Treasurer
House of Representatives and Senate
Supreme Court and Court of Appeals
Wildlife Trafficking Prevention referendum
Portland, City Commission (2nd round)
Pennsylvania
Attorney General, Auditor and Treasurer
House of Representatives and Senate
Rhode Island
House of Representatives and Senate
South Carolina
House of Representatives and Senate
South Dakota
Public Utilities Commission
House of Representatives and Senate
Establish Nonpartisan Elections, Governance of Technical Schools and Independent Redistricting Commission constitutional referendums, and Campaign Finance/Lobbying Laws, Decreased Youth Minimum Wage and  Loan Interest Rate Cap referendums
Tennessee
House of Representatives and Senate
Texas
Board of Education and Railroad Commissioner
House of Representatives and Senate
Supreme Court, Court of Criminal Appeals and Courts of Appeals
Austin, City Council (1st round)
Bexar County, Commissioners Court
Dallas County, Commissioners Court
Harris County, Commissioners Court
Tarrant County, Commissioners Court
Utah
Governor, Attorney General, Auditor, Board of Education and Treasurer
House of Representatives and Senate
Vermont
Governor, Lieutenant Governor, Attorney General, Auditor, Secretary of State and Treasurer
House of Representatives and Senate
Virginia
Right to Work constitutional referendum
Virginia Beach, Mayor and City Council
Washington
Governor, Lieutenant Governor, Attorney General, Auditor, Insurance Commissioner, Public Lands Commissioner, Secretary of State, Superintendent of Public Instruction and Treasurer
House of Representatives and Senate
Supreme Court and Court of Appeals
Carbon Emissions Tax, Democracy Credits, Individual Gun Access Prevention, Minimum Wage and Rights of Corporations referendums
West Virginia
Governor, Agriculture Commissioner, Attorney General, Auditor, Secretary of State and Treasurer
House of Delegates and Senate
Wisconsin
Assembly and Senate
Wyoming
House of Representatives and Senate
Supreme Court retention elections
13 November: East Timor, Village Chiefs and Community Chiefs (2nd round)
19 November: India, Cooch Behar, Lakhimpur, Shahdol and Tamluk, House of the People by-elections
20 November: 
Japan, Tochigi, 
Mali, Municipal Councils
Moldova, Gagauzia, 
26 November: 
Guernsey, Alderney, President and Parliament
Nigeria, Ondo, Governor
27 November: Switzerland
Aargau, Executive Council (2nd round) and 
Basel-Landschaft, 
Basel-Stadt, Executive Council (2nd round)
Bern, 
Fribourg, Council of State (2nd round)
Geneva, referendums
Lucerne, 
Obwalden, referendums
Schaffhausen, referendum
Thurgau, 
Zug, 
Zürich, 
28 November: 
India, Maharashtra, Municipal Councils and Town Councils (1st phase)
Jamaica, Mayors, Municipal Councils, Parish Mayors and Parish Councils
Pakistan, NA-258, National Assembly by-election
Trinidad and Tobago, Trinidad, Regional Councils and Municipal Councils

December
1 December: United Kingdom, Richmond Park, House of Commons by-election
3 December: New Zealand, Mount Roskill, House of Representatives by-election
4 December: Moldova, Gagauzia, 
8 December: United Kingdom, Sleaford and North Hykeham, House of Commons 
10 December: 
Nigeria, Rivers, House of Representatives, Senate and House of Assembly (revote in 10 LGAs)
United States, Louisiana
U.S. Senate (2nd round)
Louisiana's 3rd congressional district, U.S. House of Representatives (2nd round)
Louisiana's 4th congressional district, U.S. House of Representatives (2nd round)
13 December: United States, Austin, City Council (2nd round)
14 December: 
Guernsey, Sark, Parliament
India, Maharashtra, Municipal Councils and Town Councils (2nd phase)
15 December: India, Assam
Jorhat District, Thengal Kachari Autonomous Council
Lakhimpur District, Deori Autonomous Council
18 December: 
Cyprus, Municipal Councils and Community Councils
India, Maharashtra, Municipal Councils and Town Councils (3rd phase)
20 December: Bermuda, Warwick South Central, House of Assembly by-election
21 December: Nigeria, Abia, Local Government Councils and Chairmen
22 December: Bangladesh, Narayanganj, Mayor and City Corporation
25 December: 
Republic of Macedonia, Tearce, Parliament by-election
Oman, Municipal Councils
27 December: India, Gujarat, Village Councils

References

2016 elections
2016
Political timelines of the 2010s by year
local